Leratong Hospital is a hospital in Mogale City, Krugersdorp, South Africa. The hospital won numerous awards including one for being "baby-friendly".

Coat of arms
The hospital registered a coat of arms at the Bureau of Heraldry in 1982 :  Gules,  on a sixteen-pointed star Argent, a cross potent fitchy  at  the  foot  Vert,  ensigned  with  an antique lamp Azure, enflamed Gules.  The arms were designed by Dr J.B.M. Botha.

References

Hospitals in Gauteng
Mogale City Local Municipality